Running Water Draw is an ephemeral watercourse about  long, heading about  west-northwest of Clovis, New Mexico, and trending generally east-southeast, into Texas, to join Callahan Draw at the head of the White River about  west of Floydada and  northeast of Lubbock.

See also
Blanco Canyon
Salt Fork Brazos River
List of rivers of Texas

References

External links

USGS Hydrologic Unit Map - State of Texas (1974)
Photos of the high plains of the Llano Estacado

Rivers of Texas